Nina Nannar is a British Asian journalist, who has worked for ITN News for more than 20 years.

Brought up in Scunthorpe, North Lincolnshire, she worked on Midlands Today, Children in Need (1999–2000) and the BBC News's 2000 Today.

She joined ITN in March 2001 as the media and arts correspondent for ITV News, later becoming a news correspondent. On 13 December 2016, it was announced that Nannar was to become arts editor from 2017. She has since interviewed many well-known celebrities and covered major arts events, including the Oscars and BAFTAs.

References

External links 

Year of birth missing (living people)
Living people
British people of Indian descent
People from Grimsby
ITN newsreaders and journalists